Bayóvar is a Lima Metro station on Line 1. It is the northern terminus of the line, the adjacent station is Santa Rosa. The station was opened on 3 January 2012 as part of the extension of the line from Miguel Grau.

References

Lima Metro stations
2012 establishments in Peru
Railway stations opened in 2012